The 2008 Nicky Rackard Cup was the 4th annual third tier hurling competition organised by the Gaelic Athletic Association. Sligo beat Louth in the final.

Format

Ten county teams participated in the 2008 Nicky Rackard Cup, with Fingal (north Dublin) and "South Down" (Down excluding the Ards Peninsula) bringing the total to twelve.

Group 3A: Fingal, Longford, Louth
Group 3B: Fermanagh, Leitrim, South Down
Group 3C: Donegal, Monaghan, Tyrone
Group 3D: Cavan, Sligo, Warwickshire

Each team in the group played each other once in the first phase. The top two teams in each group advanced to the quarter-finals.

Group A

Group B

Group 3C

Group 3D

Knockout stage

Bracket

2008 season facts
Sligo, the eventual winners of the competition finished the preceding league tournament without a win, resulting in relegation to division 4 next year. Donegal, who won every game of the league, were eliminated from the Championship at the first (group stage) hurdle.

Sligo had the opportunity of defending their crown in 2009 after losing 1–17 to 1–13 to Roscommon in the championship promotion/relegation play-off. However a change in the Hurling competition structures with the introduction of a 4th tier championship Lory Meagher Cup meant that sligo and Roscommon both played in the 2009 Nicky Rackard Cup.

The Sligo team that won the 2008 Nicky Rackard Cup was

C Brennan; F Coyne, W Gill, R Cox; D Clarke, M Burke (0-01), L Reidy; J Mullins, D Collery; M Gilmartin (0-01), D Burke (0-02), P Severs (1-04, 0-03f); J Bannerton (1-01), K Raymond (1-08), L Cadden (0-01)

Subs J O'Brien F Hayes C Herrity R Haughey N Cadden J Kelly S Kerins M Shelly C O'Mahony D Cox C Hacket K Doyle P Quinn

Nicky Rackard Cup
Nicky Rackard Cup